Denny Sumargo (born 11 October 1981) is a former basketball player for Indonesia's basketball national team, actor, model and TV Host. Living in Jakarta,  Indonesia, he was known for his speed and powerful slam dunk. He played as a guard.

See also 
 FIBA Asia Championship 2007
 FIBA Asia Championship 2007 squads

References

External links
 Basket Asia Profile

1981 births
Living people
Indonesian men's basketball players
Sportspeople from Jakarta
Sportspeople from Makassar
Indonesian people of Chinese descent
Minangkabau people
21st-century Indonesian people